Barikul is a village in the Ranibandh CD block in the Khatra subdivision of the Bankura district  in the state of West Bengal, India.

Geography

Location

Area overview
The map alongside shows the Khatra subdivision of Bankura district. Physiographically, this area is having uneven lands with hard rocks. In the Khatra CD block area there are some low hills. The Kangsabati project reservoir is prominently visible in the map. The subdued patches in the map show forested areas It is an almost fully rural area.

Note: The map alongside presents some of the notable locations in the subdivision. All places marked in the map are linked in the larger full screen map.

Demographics
According to the 2011 Census of India, Barikul had a total population of 988 of which males were 494 (50%) and females= 494 (50%). Population in the age range of 0–6 years was 97. The total number of literate persons in Barikul was 611 (68.57% of the population over 6 years).

.*For language details see Ranibandh (community development block)#Language and religion

Civic administration

Police station
Barikul police station has jurisdiction over a part of the Ranibandh  CD block. The area covered is 63177.02 acres with a population of 73,188. The police station was set up in 2005.

Education
Barikul Uday Bharati High School is a Bengali-medium coeducational institution established in 1968. It has facilities for teaching from class V to class XII. The school has 7 computers, a library with 150 books and a playground.

Chhendapathar SKST High School is a Bengali-medium coeducational institution established in 1974. It has facilities for teaching from class V to class XII. The school has 5 computers, a library with 200 books and a playground.

Bhulagara Junior High School is a Bengali-medium co-educational institution established in 2009. It has facilities for teaching from class V to class VIII. The school has a playground.

Healthcare
There is a primary health centre at Barikul, with 2 beds.

References

Villages in Bankura district